SeaChange is an Australian drama television series that aired on ABC (Australian Broadcasting Corporation) from 1998 to 2000 and on Nine Network, where it was revived in 2019.

The series is the successful recipient of several awards and nominations, most notably from the Australian Film Institute (now the AACTA Awards) and the Logie Awards, while it has also been awarded for its music and score.

ARIA Music Awards

Australian Film Institute

Australian Guild of Screen Composers

Logie Awards

Notes

References

Lists of awards by television series